War Chant (foaled 1997 in Kentucky) is an American Thoroughbred racehorse best known for winning the 2000 Breeders' Cup Mile for owners and breeders, Irving & Marjorie Cowan.

Retired to stud, War Chant stands at Three Chimneys Farm.

References

1997 racehorse births
Racehorses bred in Kentucky
Racehorses trained in the United States
Breeders' Cup Mile winners
Thoroughbred family 4-r